The Carinthian Farmers' Association was a political party in Austria.

History
The party contested the 1919 Constitutional Assembly elections, receiving 1.1% of the national vote and two seats. In the parliamentary elections the following year it was part of the German Nationals group, which won 28 seats.

References

Defunct political parties in Austria
Political parties with year of disestablishment missing
Political parties with year of establishment missing
Defunct liberal political parties in Austria
German nationalism in Austria
German nationalist political parties
National liberal parties
Nationalist parties in Austria
Agrarian parties in Austria